Carolina Isabel Colón Juarbe (born May 16, 1993), better known by her stage name Gale (pronounced gah-leh; stylized as GALE), is a Puerto Rican singer, songwriter and actress, best known for her song "Levántate", which was selected as the official song of the 2017 CONCACAF Gold Cup in Spanish by the American Spanish-language broadcast television network Univision.

Early life and career
Gale was born in Arecibo, Puerto Rico on May 16, 1993, to a family of musicians. Her grandfather played the cuatro and her father is a musician and guitarist. Growing up, Gale was certain that singing and songwriting was going to be her profession in life. As a child, she imitated Christina Aguilera, Selena, and Shakira, who are some of her early musical influences, and wrote her first song at the age of 8 titled "Amor Sincero".

At the age of 12, Gale and her mother move to San Juan where she began to receive formal musical education at the Escuela Libre de Música, an academic and music school from Puerto Rico, where she specialized in guitar and classical singing and was a member of the school choir. Gale also took private lessons with locally renowned vocal coach Hilda Ramos.

During her high-school years, she begins to train in musical theatre as a member of the Black Box Theatre Workshop in Puerto Rico, later participating in the musical plays Rent, Spring Awakening, Contratiempo, and Viva Julia de Burgos. Musical theatre contributed to her stage presence and artistic development.

During her college years, Gale began posting covers on her YouTube channel and singing at local gigs and festivals in Puerto Rico. One of her covers was for "Que No" a song by Puerto Rican singer Pedro Capó who, after seeing the cover, invited Gale to sing with him at one of his concerts. Gale later won a contest to sing with Draco Rosa in front of a sold-out crowd at the Coliseo de Puerto Rico.

After receiving a bachelor's degree in advertising from the University of Puerto Rico and a certification in songwriting from Berklee College of Music, Gale moved to Miami in 2016 to pursue her professional singing career and begins the production of her first single as an independent artist titled "Fantasma", an Electropop song of her composition and the production of Colombian producer Juan Andres Ceballos, aka Nito. The song was launched digitally on October 25, 2016. Soon after, she began to work on the production of her first album titled "Espirales Sin Sentido", which she funded by selling her 10-year-old SUV and an Indiegogo crowdfunding campaign.

As the album was being produced, she released two other singles of her composition: “Caramelo”, a Latin Pop track written and produced by herself and the pop ballad "Respirar" at the beginning of 2017. On June 23, 2017, Gale self-released her debut album "Espirales Sin Sentido" under her own label Blue Madness Records, a 10-song album which includes the participation of producer Juan Ceballos and Grammy winners Dan Warner and Felipe Tichauer.

On June 25, 2017 Univision announced on its flagship show República Deportiva that it selected "Levántate", a dance song from the album, as the official song of the 2017 CONCACAF Gold Cup for the promotion and coverage of the soccer tournament. The song was written and produced by Gale and Juan Andres Ceballos and became the promotional single of the album during that time. Gale followed up with "Incontrolable", a dancehall infused track, later that year.

Gale's album promotion came to a halt when Hurricane Maria hit her homeland of Puerto Rico. After experiencing the devastation caused by the force of nature, Gale wrote a song for the people of Puerto Rico called "Aquí estamos" which she released on January 19, 2018.

“Como Cuando" is the latest single off of "Espirales Sin Sentido" released February 20, 2018.

Discography

Musical, theatre and television credits

References

External links
 GALE's Official website

Living people
People from Arecibo, Puerto Rico
Puerto Rican guitarists
Puerto Rican pop singers
Puerto Rican women composers
Latin pop singers
Puerto Rican multi-instrumentalists
1993 births
21st-century Puerto Rican women singers
Puerto Rican singer-songwriters
Latin music songwriters
Women in Latin music